Eremophila drummondii, commonly known as Drummond's eremophila, is a flowering plant in the figwort family, Scrophulariaceae and is endemic to the south-west of Western Australia. It is a variable shrub, usually with sticky branches and leaves, long, thin leaves and mauve or purple flowers in spring.

Description
It usually has sticky, shiny leaves and branches, (less so west of Menzies) and the branches have grooves below the leaf bases. The leaves have a smooth, glabrous surface.

The petals are a blue, mauve or purple on the outside and white inside the tube. The petal tube and the lobes are shiny and glabrous but the inside of the tube is filled with long, soft hairs. The 4 stamens are fully enclosed in the petal tube. Flowering occurs in many months of the year but mostly in August and September.

Taxonomy and naming
The species was first formally described in 1868 by Ferdinand von Mueller in Fragmenta phytographiae Australiae. The specific epithet (drummondii) honours James Drummond.

Distribution and habitat
Drummond's eremophila is widespread and common between York and Southern Cross in the Avon Wheatbelt, Coolgardie, Mallee and Esperance Plains biogeographic regions. It grows in a variety of soil types, mostly in eucalyptus and acacia mallee woodland.

Conservation status
Eremophila drummondii is classified as "not threatened" by the Western Australian Government Department of Parks and Wildlife.

Use in horticulture
This eremophila has several forms, all of which are attractive garden plants. The low-growing ones are very compact and produce masses of flowers in spring, contrasting with their glossy foliage. All can be grown from cuttings and grow in a wide range of soils, preferring full sun but are drought resistant and tolerant of frost when established.

References

drummondii
Eudicots of Western Australia
Plants described in 1868
Endemic flora of Western Australia
Taxa named by Ferdinand von Mueller